Kalinowski's agouti (Dasyprocta kalinowskii) is a species of rodent in the family Dasyproctidae. It is endemic to southeast Peru. It occurs at elevations of up to  asl. It is threatened by habitat loss.

References

Dasyprocta
Mammals of Peru
Mammals described in 1897
Taxa named by Oldfield Thomas
Taxonomy articles created by Polbot